Podsie O'Mahony (born 1973 in Ballincollig, County Cork) is an Irish sportsperson. He plays Gaelic football with his local club Ballincollig and was a member of the Cork senior inter-county team from the 1990s until the 2000s.

The forward was also a talented hurler. He played minor for Cork and also played hurling through the ranks for his club Ballincollig

References

1979 births
Living people
Ballincollig Gaelic footballers
Cork inter-county Gaelic footballers
Munster inter-provincial Gaelic footballers